Meine Seele rühmt und preist (My soul extols and praises), is a church cantata credited to Johann Sebastian Bach and Melchior Hoffmann.

History and text 
This is a solo cantata composed for the Feast of the Visitation of Mary. The librettist of the work is unknown. The German text of the cantata is a paraphrase of the Magnificat.

An old largely lost source attributes the cantata to Melchior Hoffmann (although seemingly confusing the composer with Johann Georg Hoffmann, an organist in Breslau). Throughout the 19th century the cantata was generally attributed to Bach. Only in the second half of the 20th century was the attribution restored to Melchior Hoffmann again in most sources.

Movements and scoring 
The work in five movements is scored for solo tenor voice, two recorders, oboe, violin, and basso continuo.
Aria "Meine Seele rühmt und preist"
Recitative "Denn seh' ich mich und auch mein Leben an"
Aria "Gott hat sich hoch gesetzet"
Recitative "O wass vor grosse Dinge treff ich an allen Orten an"
Aria "Deine Güte, dein Erbarmen"

Recordings 

Curt Sachs ensemble, Max Meili. L'anthologie Sonore, 1935.
Paris Conservatory Orchestra, Charles Munch. Charles Munch, Vol. 2. Disque Gramophone, 1941.
Bach-Orchester Stuttgart, Hans Grischkat. J.S. Bach: Cantatas BWV 51 & BWV 189. Renaissance, 1951.
Orchestre de Chambre "Pro Arte" de Munich, Kurt Redel. J.S. Bach: Cantatas Nos. 189 · 89 · 174. Erato, 1956.
Ernst Haefliger soloist, Münchner Bach-Orchester, Karl Richter, Kantaten BWV 55 & BWV 189, Archiv-Produktion 1959
Peter Schreier soloist and conductor, Festival Strings Lucerne,  "Bach Kantaten fur Tenor" Ariola-Eurodisc 1976
Kammerorchester Carl Philipp Emanuel Bach, Peter Schreier. J.S. Bach: Solo-Kantaten und Arien. Philips, 1994.
Members of Schola Cantorum Basiliensis, Nicolai Gedda (1971). Les introuvables de Nicolai Gedda. EMI Classics, 1995
 Helmut Müller-Brühl, conducting Markus Schäfer and the Cologne Chamber Orchestra (2004).

References

External links 
 

Church cantatas
Bach: spurious and doubtful works
Magnificat settings
German church music